The Second Supreme Court of Canada building sat to the west of Parliament Hill in Ottawa and was home to the Supreme Court of Canada from 1882 to 1945.

Built in 1874, it was built by Chief Dominion Architect Thomas Seaton Scott for Department of Works as a workshop to maintain buildings on Parliament Hill. Modified by Thomas Fuller from 1882 onwards it was shared by the Supreme Court and National Gallery of Canada for six years until the former became the only tenant.

Prior to 1882, the Supreme Court conducted their business in various committee rooms on Parliament Hill, including the Railway Committee Room. The court finally got a permanent home within a decade of its creation.

The first building for the Supreme Court was built on Bank Street near Parliament. The design was considered quaint and was less elegant than other government buildings in Ottawa. Although similar in design to the West Block and the East Block, it was a more subdued modern Gothic Revival design. After the Supreme Court moved to its new site to the west of Parliament in 1949, this building was demolished in 1955 after it was condemned as a fire hazard. It is the only building on Parliament Hill to be demolished.

The site is currently a parking lot and vehicle screening facility for Parliament Hill.

References

External links

 Creation and Beginnings of the Court. Archived from the original
Supreme Court of Canada
Federal government buildings in Ottawa
Courthouses in Canada
Demolished buildings and structures in Ottawa
History of Ottawa
Legal history of Canada
Gothic Revival architecture in Ottawa
1874 establishments in Ontario
1955 disestablishments in Ontario
Buildings and structures demolished in 1955